The GAZ-66 is a Soviet and later Russian 4x4 all-road (off-road) military truck produced by GAZ. It was one of the main cargo  vehicles for motorized infantry of the Soviet Army and is still employed in former Soviet Union countries. It is nicknamed shishiga (шишига), shisharik (шишарик)/shehsherik (шешерик), trueman (in Siberia).

Almost one million vehicles of this type were built for both military and civil use. The GAZ-66 has gained legendary status in many countries around the world due to its reliability, simplicity and off-road capability. Since the 1960s, the GAZ-66 has been popular with armed forces and off-road enthusiasts. Production ceased in 1999, with the GAZ-3308 being produced instead.

Basic versions

 GAZ-66-1 (1964-1968) - the first model with no centralized system for adjusting the air pressure in the tires
 GAZ-66A (1964-1968) - with a winch
 GAZ-34 - a 6×6 prototype
 GAZ-66B (1966) - Paratrooper version with telescopic steering column, folding roof and folding windshield frame
 BM-21V "Grad-V" (Vozdushnodesantiy – 'airborne') (NATO designation M1975): Developed for airborne troops in 1969. A GAZ-66B four-by-four truck chassis is fitted with a 12-round 122 mm rocket launcher. The vehicle is sturdy enough to be air-dropped. Parts of the vehicle such as the canvas cab roof can be taken off or folded down to reduce its size during transit. Like the BM-21, the BM-21V has stabilizing jacks on the rear of the vehicle for support when firing. The launch vehicle has the industrial index of 9P125.
 GAZ-66D (1964-1968) - the chassis with a power take-off
 GAZ-66P - tractor (experimental)
 GAZ-66E (1964-1968) - with shielded electrical equipment
 GAZ-66-01 (1968-1985) - the base model with a centralized control system for tire pressure
 GAZ-66-02 (1968-1985) - with a winch
 GAZ-66-03 (1964-1968) - with shielded electrical equipment
 GAZ-66-04 (1968-1985) - the chassis with shielded electrical equipment
 GAZ-66-05 (1968-1985) - with shielded electrical equipment and a winch
 GAZ-66-11 (1985-1996) - upgraded base model
 GAZ-66-12 (1985-1996) - with a winch
 GAZ-66-14 (1985-1996) - the chassis with shielded electrical equipment and a power take-off

Military versions
 GAZ-66-15 (1985-1996) - with shielded electrical equipment and a winch
 GAZ-66-16 (1991-1993) - modernized version with ZMZ-513.10, reinforced tires (wheels - lean), completed the brakes, the platform without intruding wheel niches (also installed on GAZ-66-11 and GAZ-66-40 ), load capacity 2.3 tons
 GAZ-66-21 (1993-1995) - the national-economic modification with the dual tires and rear axle wooden platform GAZ-53, load capacity 3.5 tons
 GAZ-66-31 - chassis for trucks
 GAZ-66-41 (1992-1995) - a naturally aspirated GAZ-544 diesel engine
 GAZ-66-40 (1995-1999) - with a GAZ-5441 turbodiesel
 GAZ-66-92 (1987-1995) - for use in the far north
 GAZ-66-96 - chassis for shift buses

Export versions
 GAZ-66-51 (1968-1985)
 GAZ-66-52 (1968-1985) - with a winch
 GAZ-66-81 (1985-1995) - for countries with a temperate climate
 GAZ-66-91 (1985-1995) - for countries with a tropical climate

Specialised versions
 AP-2 - aid station, the main transport unit regimental aid station.
 AS-66 - ambulance, designed to evacuate the wounded.
 DDA-2 - disinfecting shower installation, is used in the military (sometimes civil) sanitary-epidemiological units.
 GZSA-731, 983A, 947, 3713, 3714 - Vans "Mail", "bread" and "Medicine"
 MZ-66 - Lube.
 3902, 3903, 39021, 39031 - mobile workshops to provide technical assistance to agricultural machinery.
 2001, 2002, 3718, 3719, 3716, 3924, 39521 - mobile clinics
 NZAS-3964, Volgar-39461 - watch buses
 GAZ-SAZ-3511 - tipper for agricultural purposes on the GAZ-66-31 (build - Saransk).
 GAZ-KAZ-3511 - tipper for agricultural purposes on GAZ-66-31 (build - Bishkek, Kyrgyzstan)

Operators
 
  
 
 
 
 
 
 
 
  - Armed Forces of the Republic of Moldova
 
 
 
 
  Romania - Romanian Armed Forces
 
  Transnistria
  - Ukrainian Armed Forces

Former operators
  – purchased 200 regular GAZ-66 trucks and 100 special versions for Finnish defence forces 1972–1975. Another round (140 units) in year 1986–1989.
  – passed on to  after reunification; retired.
  – passed on to successor states.

Specifications 
Specifications for GAZ-66-11
Design
 Cab-forward design, 2-seat cab + 21 passengers in the back.
 Payload:  plus the same weight trailer
 Suspension: Solid axles with leaf springs
Engine
 Type- ZMZ-66-06 V8 petrol (carburetor) OHV engine; heavy duty version of the ZMZ-53
 Displacement: 4,254 cc (Bore , Stroke )
 Compression ratio: 7.6:1
 Output:  @ 3,200 rpm
 Torque:  @ 2,000-2200 rpm
 Max. speed- (speed governed)
Brakes
 Type: Drums, with hydraulic control, single circuit, servo assisted
 Stopping distance from 20 mph: 27'
Measurements
 L×W×H:  x  x (cab) / (tent)
 Wheelbase: 
 Track front/rear: /
 Curb weight: 
 Fuel tanks: 2 x 
 Fuel economy: 
Maneuverability
 Turning circle: 
 Approach angle: 41°
 Departure angle: 32°
 Max. ascent angle: 31–37° (fully loaded)
 Ground clearance: 
 Fording depth: 
Tires
 Size: 12–18"
 Pressure: Adjustable with central tyre inflation system from cab

Popular culture

 In the 2010 game Call of Duty: Black Ops, the GAZ-66 is used as a transport for guards in the level "Vorkuta".
 It is mentioned in the 1991 Tom Clancy novel The Sum Of All Fears. 
 In the Russian version of the TV show Top Gear, a test was conducted on the vehicle's strengths: the body had building rubble dropped on it, it was set on fire and submerged in water. After all these tests, it kept going.
 The GAZ-66 was featured in the movie The Expendables 2 with Jean-Claude Van Damme.
 The GAZ-66 is a truck in the game Spintires: MudRunner with the name of B-66 due to copyright claims
 In the 2019 HBO TV miniseries Chernobyl, the truck is used by Gen. Col. Vladimir Pikalov, commander of the Soviet Chemical Troops, to carry out a radiation measuring at the damaged power plant, with high-range dosimeter placed at the front and lead sheets covering the cabin.
 In the 2020 film Wonder Woman 1984. Appears in the Middle Eastern convoy scene.

References

External links 

 English website for Russian Military Trucks
 The UK home of the Gaz 66
 GAZ-66 enthusiast group
 The German home of the GAZ-66
 German blog with GAZ-66 restoration and travel info
 GAZ-66 enthusiast website
 Polish GAZ-66 site
 GAZ-66 expedition site
 GAZ-66 blog
 GAZ-66 Video
 GAZ-66 Video
 GAZ-66 Video
 History of the predecessor of GAZ-66 - GAZ-62 (rus)
 GAZ-66 3d model 
 GAZ-66 3d 360-view

All-wheel-drive vehicles
GAZ Group trucks
Military trucks of the Soviet Union
Military vehicles of Russia
Cars of Russia
Vehicles introduced in 1964
Military vehicles introduced in the 1960s